Residue of the Residents is an outtakes compilation released by American art rock group The Residents in 1983, collecting miscellaneous recordings from the band's career from 1971 to 1983.

Track listing

 Track 2 was originally released on the 1977 various artists compilation Blorp Esette.
Track 5, "Shut Up Shut Up", is an alternate mix of the Commercial Single track.
Tracks 6 and 12, "Anvil Forest" and "Open Up", are outtakes from The Tunes of Two Cities.
 Track 7 is a remix of the 1980 Diskomo single.
 Track 9, "Ups and Downs", is an early version of the Commercial Album track.
 Track 10, "Walter Westinghouse", was originally released on the 1977 EP Babyfingers, and is included on most CD reissues of Fingerprince.
Track 11, "Saint Nix", was originally recorded in 1974 but overdubbed for inclusion on the album.

Residue Deux 
An updated edition of the album was released in 1998 and titled Residue Deux.

 Track 8, "Jailhouse Rock", is a different version, recorded in 1986 as a single.
 Track 10, "Scent of Mint", another outtake from The Tunes of Two Cities, replaces "Walter Westinghouse".
 Track 13, "From the Plains to Mexico", was originally released in 1989 as a single in Italy with the Residents' book An Almost Complete Collection of Lyrics: 1972 to 1988.
 Tracks 14-17 were originally released on the 1979 Ralph Records sampler Subterranean Modern. The album also contained music from Chrome, MX-80 and Tuxedomoon.
 Tracks 18 and 22, "Daydream Believer" and "Daydream in Space", were originally released on the 1991 fan club compilation Daydream B-Liver.
 Tracks 19-21 were originally released as bonus tracks on the 1988 CD edition of The Big Bubble.

2014 Superior Viaduct reissue 

 Track 14, "Loser ≅ Weed", was originally released in 1976 as the B-side to the "Satisfaction" single.
 Tracks 15 and 16, "Death in Barstow" and "Melon Collie Lassie", are tracks from Babyfingers.

References

External links
 https://www.residents.com/historical/?page=residue
 

The Residents albums
1984 compilation albums
Ralph Records albums